The Lace Wars (French: Les fêtes galantes) is a 1965 French-Romanian historical comedy film directed by René Clair and starring Jean-Pierre Cassel, Philippe Avron and Marie Dubois.

Plot
In the 18th century, as the army of Prince de Beaulieu lays siege on the fortress of Marechal d'Allenberg, a young princess sends a soldier out of the fortress to go find her lover.

Cast
Jean-Pierre Cassel as Jolicoeur  
Philippe Avron as Thomas  
Marie Dubois as Divine - la actrice  
Geneviève Casile as Hélène - la princesse  
Jean Richard as Le Prince de Beaulieu  
György Kovács as Le Maréchal d'Allenberg  
Fory Etterle 
Elena Caragiu
Adela Marculescu 
Melania Cârje 
Florin Vasiliu 
Christian Baratier as Frédéric  
Jean Payen 
Alfred Adam as Le sergent Bel-Oeil 
Matei Alexandru 
Lucia Amram 
Mircea Balaban 
Michael Berechet 
Mihai Mereuta 
Dem Radulescu 
Grigore Vasiliu-Birlic

References

Bibliography
Celia McGerr. René Clair. Twayne Publishers, 1980.

External links

1965 films
1960s historical comedy films
Romanian historical comedy films
French historical comedy films
1960s French-language films
Films directed by René Clair
Films set in the 18th century
1960s French films